The Marusia massacre (March, 1925) was the response of the Chilean government under president Arturo Alessandri to a strike by the workers of a saltpeter mine leading to over 500 dead, over ninety percent being strikers or their family members.

Background 
The nitrate oficina (saltpeter mine) of Marusia was located in the foothills of the Andes in the región de Tarapacá, about 4 miles northwest of the town of Huara. Its  monthly production was 865 tons of salt. In March 1925, the mine workers went on strike to demand higher pay, a shorter workday, and better working conditions. While the negotiations were taking place between the company executives and the worker's representatives, the British engineer who ran the mine, a man much hated because of his habit of whipping his workers, was found dead near the mine. A Bolivian engineer was accused of the crime and executed without due process by decision of the company owners.

Events
The union, under the leadership of Domingo Soto, was afraid of reprisals, and especially of another massacre like the one that had happened only a few years before in San Gregorio, so they decided to take several preventive measures. They contacted the other mines, and proposed to blow up the railroad tracks in order to prevent the arrival of strikebreakers. The government, upon being apprised of the unrest, responded by sending forty soldiers under the command of captain Gilberto Troncoso, known as the "Hyena of San Gregorio" for his violent behaviour.

The women of Marusia organized themselves under the leadership of Selva Saavedra, and decided to resist the advance of the troops. When the soldiers arrived, they entered the town shooting. A group of workers responded by throwing dynamite sticks at them, killing several soldiers and seizing their guns. Then the workers mounted a counteroffensive, taking over the explosives depot of the mine and cutting the telegraphic wires. Captain Troncoso was forced to retreat.

The miners proceeded to arm the whole town (about 2,400 people). In an open assembly, the union leaders proposed to negotiate their surrender, while some miners advocated calling upon the help of the workers from other mines. In the end, a motion by Soto that the town priest be asked to mediate was adopted.

The army reinforcements arrived in the form of a 300-man battalion under the command of Colonel Pedro Schultz. They attacked the town in the middle of the night and machine-gunned everyone in sight. Hundreds died, including women and children — the exact number was never properly established. A group of workers were able to mount a hasty defense, throwing dynamite sticks at the advancing troops, and they managed to kill 36 soldiers and to injure 64. The surviving miners escaped with their families into the high mountains. This put an end to the immediate strike, but the conflict flared again less than two months later, and led to the La Coruña massacre.

Popular culture

The film titled Letters from Marusia is based on a Patricio Manns novel (1974) inspired by these events.

See also
Arturo Alessandri
San Gregorio massacre
La Coruña massacre
History of Chile
List of massacres in Chile
Santa María School massacre

References

External links
Military interventions in Chilean politics 
Movie Actas de Marusia (1976), based on the event

Conflicts in 1925
Massacres in 1925
March 1925 events
Social history of Chile
History of labour relations in Chile
Protest-related deaths
Massacres in Chile
1925 in Chile
Mass murder in 1925
1925 labor disputes and strikes
Political violence in Chile
Miners' labor disputes